Peter Onions (1724 – 1798) was an English ironmaster and the inventor of an early puddling process used for the refining of pig iron into wrought iron.

Biography
Onions was born in Broseley, Shropshire, later moving to Merthyr Tydfil in Wales. He married Elizabeth Guest, sister of John Guest, a founder of Guest, Keen and Nettlefold, which is today the British conglomerate GKN In 1783, Onions received patent number 1370 for his invention. Henry Cort later improved on Onion's process during the development of his puddling furnace.

References

cc

1724 births
1798 deaths
Businesspeople from Shropshire
Foundrymen
British ironmasters
Engineers from Shropshire
People from Broseley
People of the Industrial Revolution